Olivier Christophe Lusamba (born 16 March 1993) is a professional footballer who plays as a striker. He was last seen playing for Illkirch-Graffenstaden. Born in France, he represented DR Congo at youth level.

Lusamba started his career at Nancy, playing then for the Spanish club Zamora, French clubs: Amnéville, Boulogne and Épinal and in Belgium for OH Leuven and Eendracht Aalst. In the summer of 2017 Lusamba transferred in Romania at Olimpia Satu Mare for which he scored 8 goals in 20 matches. In the winter break of the season, Olimpia retired from Liga II, after having encountered major financial problems and Olivier signed with ASU Politehnica.

International career
Lusamba played for DR Congo U-21 in 2 matches and did not score any goals.

References

External links
 

1993 births
Living people
Footballers from Metz
Democratic Republic of the Congo footballers
French footballers
Association football forwards
Democratic Republic of the Congo international footballers
AS Nancy Lorraine players
CSO Amnéville players
Segunda División B players
Championnat National players
US Boulogne players
SAS Épinal players
Challenger Pro League players
Oud-Heverlee Leuven players
Belgian Third Division players
S.C. Eendracht Aalst players
Liga II players
FC Olimpia Satu Mare players
SSU Politehnica Timișoara players
US Rumelange players
Democratic Republic of the Congo expatriate footballers
Democratic Republic of the Congo expatriate sportspeople in Belgium
Democratic Republic of the Congo expatriate sportspeople in Romania
Democratic Republic of the Congo expatriate sportspeople in Spain
French expatriate footballers
French expatriate sportspeople in Belgium
French expatriate sportspeople in Luxembourg
French expatriate sportspeople in Romania
French expatriate sportspeople in Spain
Expatriate footballers in Belgium
Expatriate footballers in Luxembourg
Expatriate footballers in Romania
Expatriate footballers in Spain